Air Marshal Charandas Gurudas Devashar (19 June 1924 – before 10 February 2017) was an officer in the Indian Air Force and a recipient of the Param Vishisht Seva Medal (PVSM).

References 

1924 births
Year of death missing
Indian Air Force air marshals
Indian Air Force officers
Indian aviators
Recipients of the Param Vishisht Seva Medal